HCCC may refer to:

Hampshire County Cricket Club in England, UK
Health Care Complaints Commission in NSW, Australia
Holy Cross Catholic Cemetery, a Catholic cemetery in Chai Wan, Hong Kong
Hoppers Crossing Cricket Club in Victoria, Australia
Hudson County Community College in NJ, USA
Hyalinizing clear cell carcinoma